The 2018–19 UEFA Women's Champions League was the 18th edition of the European women's club football championship organised by UEFA, and the 10th edition since being rebranded as the UEFA Women's Champions League.

The final was held at the Groupama Arena in Budapest, Hungary. This was the first time since the final was played as a single match that a host city for the Women's Champions League final was not automatically assigned by which city won the bid to host the men's Champions League final.

Lyon were the defending champions and won the final against Barcelona 4–1, to win their sixth overall and fourth straight title.

Association team allocation
A maximum of 68 teams from 55 UEFA member associations were eligible to participate in the 2018–19 UEFA Women's Champions League. The association ranking based on the UEFA league coefficient for women was used to determine the number of participating teams for each association:
Associations 1–12 each had two teams qualify.
All other associations, should they enter, each had one team qualify.
The winners of the 2017–18 UEFA Women's Champions League were given an additional entry if they did not qualify for the 2018–19 UEFA Women's Champions League through their domestic league.

Association ranking
For the 2018–19 UEFA Women's Champions League, the associations were allocated places according to their 2017 UEFA league coefficients for women, which took into account their performance in European competitions from 2012–13 to 2016–17.

For the first time Switzerland had two entries, replacing Scotland in the top 12 associations.

Notes
TH – Additional berth for title holders
NR – No rank (association did not enter in any of the seasons used for computing coefficients)
DNE – Did not enter

Distribution
The format of the competition remained unchanged from previous years, starting from the qualifying round (played as mini-tournaments with four teams in each group), followed by the knockout phase starting from the round of 32 (played as home-and-away two-legged ties except for the one-match final).

Unlike the men's Champions League, not every association entered a team, and so the exact number of teams entering in each round (qualifying round and round of 32) could not be determined until the full entry list was known. In general, the title holders, the champions of the top 12 associations, and the runners-up of highest-ranked associations (exact number depending on the number of entries) received a bye to the round of 32. All other teams (runners-up of lowest-ranked associations and champions of associations starting from 13th) entered the qualifying round, with the group winners and a maximum of two best runners-up advancing to the round of 32.

Teams
A total of 60 teams from 48 associations entered the competition, with the entries confirmed by UEFA on 8 June 2018. An association must have an eleven-a-side women's domestic league (or in special circumstances, a women's domestic cup) to enter a team. Among the entrants:
20 teams entered the round of 32: the champions and runners-up from associations 1–8 (including title holders Lyon) and the champions from associations 9–12.
40 teams entered the qualifying round: the runners-up from associations 9–12 and the champions from the 36 associations ranked 13 or lower.

As KÍ Klaksvík failed to win the Faroe Islands league, their streak of having participated in every edition of the UEFA Women's Cup/Champions League have ended after 17 seasons.

Legend
TH: Women's Champions League title holders
CH: Domestic league champions
RU: Domestic league runners-up

Notes

Round and draw dates
UEFA has scheduled the competition as follows (all draws were held at the UEFA headquarters in Nyon, Switzerland).

Qualifying round

Group 1

Group 2

Group 3

Group 4

Group 5

Group 6

Group 7

Group 8

Group 9

Group 10

Ranking of second-placed teams
To determine the best two second-placed teams from the qualifying round which advanced to the knockout phase, only the results of the second-placed teams against the first and third-placed teams in their group were taken into account, while results against the fourth-placed team not included. As a result, two matches played by each second-placed team counts for the purposes of determining the ranking.

Knockout phase

Bracket

Round of 32

Round of 16

Quarter-finals

Semi-finals

Final

Statistics
Notes

Top goalscorers
Qualifying goals count towards the topscorer award.

Squad of the season
The following players were named in the squad of the season:

Goalkeepers
Sandra Paños (Barcelona)
Sarah Bouhaddi (Lyon)

Defenders
Millie Bright (Chelsea)
Amel Majri (Lyon)
Wendie Renard (Lyon)
Irene Paredes (Paris Saint-Germain)
Lucy Bronze (Lyon)
Griedge M'Bock Bathy (Lyon)

Midfielders
Vicky Losada (Barcelona)
Melanie Leupolz (Bayern München)
Amandine Henry (Lyon)
Dzsenifer Marozsán (Lyon)
Alexia Putellas (Barcelona)

Forwards
Erin Cuthbert (Chelsea)
Ada Hegerberg (Lyon)
Eugénie Le Sommer (Lyon)
Pernille Harder (Wolfsburg)
Karen Carney (Chelsea)

See also
2018–19 UEFA Champions League

References

External links

European league standings

 
2018-19
Women's Champions League
2018 in women's association football
2019 in women's association football